Qashliq, Isker or Sibir (Siberian Tatar language: Esker-tora) was a medieval (14th–16th century) Siberian Tatar fortress, in the 16th century the capital of the Khanate of Sibir, located on the right bank of the Irtysh River at its confluence with the Sibirka rivulet, some 17 km from the modern city of Tobolsk. 
The fortress is first mentioned in Russian sources of the 14th century.

The period of the most development was in the first half of the 16th century. In 1582 the troops of Cossack ataman Yermak seized and ruined Qashliq. The ruined city was retaken by the Siberian Tatars in 1584 only to be lost forever in 1586. The nearby city of Tobolsk was founded in 1587.

Sources differ on the exact location of the fortress. Most give the distance upriver from Tobolsk as 17 or 18 km, or versts, or ten to eleven miles, but others give 23 km. Sources of the early 19th century claim that the ruins of the fortress could still be made out with difficulty.
The modern village of Sibiryak is located close to the site.

References

External links
Photograph of the approximate site (Ant-13 at Panoramio)

Buildings and structures in Tyumen Oblast
Defunct towns in Russia
Former populated places in Russia
Forts in Russia
Destroyed cities
Populated places on the Irtysh River
Khanate of Sibir
Cultural heritage monuments in Tyumen Oblast
Objects of cultural heritage of Russia of federal significance